The Orion Songbook is the debut full-length album by Frontier Ruckus, released November 6, 2008.

Reception
The album received positive reviews, with Allmusic stating that it is "about as good a debut as a band can hope for." Crawdaddy! praised the album's musical and lyrical landscapes, marked by the "desolate beauty of Matthew Milia's poetry and the quiet intensity the band brings to every note it plays." The album received similar applause from Under the Radar regarding the interplay of musicality and language, described as "white-hot folk music" paired with "dank and smart turns of phrase."  Hear/Say called The Orion Songbook "the year's best alt-country album," establishing the band as a "formidable outfit with a sound to reckon with and an easy confidence to match." Likewise, Metro Times stated that the album "establishes the group as already one of the very best sounds to come out of Michigan this entire decade." Inland Empire Weekly commended the record for its consideration of memory "without the cloying nostalgia or self-consciousness that derails so many attempts to turn back the clock to allegedly purer times," going on to state: "...by looking the present straight in the eye, Milia’s created something timeless."

Adult Swim used "Dark Autumn Hour" for four ads in their well-known series of bumps, first airing in September 2011.

Track listing
All songs written by Matthew Milia
"Animals Need Animals"
"The Latter Days"
"What You Are"
"Dark Autumn Hour"
"Mount Marcy"
"The Blood"
"Bethlehem"
"Foggy Lilac Windows"
"Orion Town 2"
"The Back-Lot World"
"Rosemont"
"Orion Town 3"
"Adirondack Amish Holler"
"The Deep-Yard Dream"

Personnel
Frontier Ruckus
Matthew Milia - lead vocals, guitar, harmonica, pedal steel guitar, piano, chord organ
David Winston Jones - banjo, voice, ebow
Eli Eisman - bass
Ryan "Smalls" Etzcorn - drum kit, all percussions, mallet-saw, chain-rattle, stomping
Zachary Nichols - trumpet, singing-saw, melodica, mallet-saw
Anna Burch - voice, harmonium, piano
Guest Musicians
Ryan Hay - piano on tracks 3, 6, 8
Jim Roll - fiddle on track 4

Production
Produced by Frontier Ruckus
Engineered and Mixed by Jim Roll
Mastered by Roger Seibel
Artwork and Design by Matthew Milia and Brian Peters
Recorded and Mixed at Backseat Productions in Ann Arbor, Michigan during the winter and spring of early 2008

References

External links 
 
 

2008 debut albums
Frontier Ruckus albums